Pyro Spectaculars is an American pyrotechnics and fireworks company with its primary offices in Rialto, California. They are one of the largest fireworks companies in the world today. Jim Souza is the President and CEO of the company, which was founded in 1979 by his father, Bob Souza. The company shoots hundreds of shows each year in multiple countries, including the largest fireworks show in the United States each year. The company also conducts a series of pyrotechnics classes and seminars to train licensed pyrotechnicians.

Family history 

The Souza family (formerly de Sousa) has been involved in the fireworks industry since the first decade of the twentieth century when they immigrated from the Azores to the San Francisco Bay Area. The patriarch of the family, Manuel, began making his own fireworks out of his home and firing shows for local Portuguese community festivals. As his business began to grow, the entire family became involved in the production of fireworks, enabling him to pass his trade and "cookbook" down generationally.

Manuel's son, Alfred, was recruited by the U.S. Army when WWII broke out due to the chemistry and pyrotechnic skills he had gained in the family enterprise. After his release from the service, he began to produce and shoot local fireworks shows throughout California.

Company formation
Alfred's son, Bob Souza, followed in his father's footsteps, eventually creating Pyro Spectaculars by Souza in 1979. Bob was a two-time President of the American Pyrotechnics Association and the recipient of its lifetime achievement award. His son, Jim Souza, took over as president and CEO in 1989.

Pyro Spectacular by Souza is currently one of the largest pyrotechnics companies in the world, producing shows for events like the Olympics, Super Bowl, World Cup, World Series, and Macy's Fourth of July Fireworks Spectacular. They also produce pyrotechnics and fireworks for cinema, music videos, and touring musical acts. The company produces pyrotechnics for hundreds of shows for smaller events as well, such as community events, graduations, and weddings.

Regional offices 
The company maintains regional offices throughout the United States. These locales operate as sales, distribution, and production facilities; the function of the facility is determined by the location. The major offices for Pyro Spectaculars located in the United States are:
 Rialto, California
 Sacramento, California
 San Diego, California
 San Francisco, California
 Fresno, California
 Half Moon Bay, California
 Spokane, Washington
 New York/New Jersey Metro Area
 Hawaii

Major shows by Pyro Spectaculars 
Pyro Spectaculars is responsible for the annual Macy's 4 July spectacular fireworks display in New York City, frequent shows at stadiums, and has been contracted by film crews to design shows for movies. The company's largest film contract was for the 1998 film Meet Joe Black, which made such an impression on star Brad Pitt that he later hired Pyro Spectaculars to produce a fireworks display for his wedding to Jennifer Aniston.
Some of Pyro Spectaculars by Souza's other well-known shows include:
 Macy's 4th of July Fireworks Spectacular (annually)
 100th and 125th Anniversaries of the Statue of Liberty
 1994 FIFA World Cup
 1994 Pink Floyd Concert Tour
 1996 Summer Olympics
 Opening and Closing Ceremonies of 2002 Salt Lake Winter Olympic Games
 2004 Summer Olympics
 Rose Bowl's annual Americafest
 Several Super Bowls
 Disneyland and Disney World
 Six Flags chain of amusement parks
 Astroworld
 50th Birthdays of Golden Gate and Oakland Bridges
 President Ronald Reagan's inauguration in Washington
 Apocalypse Now, for which they received an OSCAR from National Academy of Arts and Sciences
 Seattle Space Needle New Year's Fireworks: 1992–present
 World Wrestling Entertainment Pyro: 2008–present

Types of pyrotechnics 
Pyro Spectaculars by Souza produces a variety of effects for different events. They create their own brand of fireworks—which are only shot at their shows—including a brand of HD fireworks designed with the camera in mind for television audiences. Their other effects include:
 High-level shells
 Low-level effects
 Rockets
 Fireballs
 Fire rings
 Confetti cannons
 Cryogenic effects

References

Companies based in San Bernardino County, California
Fireworks companies
Rialto, California
Manufacturing companies of the United States